The Little Mermaid: Songs from the Sea is the third of three original albums inspired by Disney's The Little Mermaid film.  It is a concept album; listening to the tracks in order will present the story of a typical day in the life of the mermaid Ariel (set sometime before the events of the film).

Ariel (Jodi Benson), Sebastian (Samuel E. Wright), Scuttle (Buddy Hackett), King Triton (Kenneth Mars), and Ariel's sisters sing the songs.

Track listing
 "Sea Kingdom"
 "What's it Like to Be a Mermaid?"
 "The Scuttle Strut"
 "There's Only One Ariel"
 "He's a Friend"
 "At the Mermaids' Ball"
 "Party With Me"
 "My Room in the Sea"
 "Dreaming"
 "H2O, What a Feeling!"
 "We Share the Earth"
 "Where Mermaids Dwell"

External links

Songs from the Sea
1992 albums
Walt Disney Records albums
Works based on The Little Mermaid